John MacDonald (7 December 1890 – 1 June 1980) was a Scotland international rugby union player.

Rugby Union career

Amateur career

He played club rugby for Edinburgh Wanderers.

Provincial career

He played for Edinburgh District against Glasgow District in the 1910 inter-city match. Edinburgh won the match 26–5, with MacDonald scoring a try.

He played for the Blues Trial side against the Whites Trial side on 21 January 1911, while still with Edinburgh Wanderers. He scored 3 tries for the Blues, but it could not prevent a 26–19 win for the Whites.

International career

He was capped once for the Scotland international rugby union team in 1911.

References

Scottish rugby union players
Scotland international rugby union players
Edinburgh Wanderers RFC players
1890 births
1980 deaths
Blues Trial players
Edinburgh District (rugby union) players
Rugby union wings